The Cinebulle is a hot air balloon specially adapted for filming. It uses a propeller on the back like a microlight.

The gondola is a two-seat bench for the pilot and cameraman. The camera is held by a Ronford mini 7 head, fitted on a pivoting device enabling the camera to be set either between the pilot and cameraman or underneath the seat, from where panoramic and near-vertical filming is possible.

When the camera is under the seat, a battery-operated black and white video viewfinder allows for framing and focusing without being bothered by sun light.

Weather permitting, the Cinebulle is steered with a propulsion engine located at the back of the gondola.

As a hot air balloon, the Cinebulle cannot fly in high winds, and is most easily operated in mornings or evenings, which has the advantage of being the times when light is most suitable for filming.

The Cinebulle was invented by Dany Cleyet-Marrel starting in 1994 with a canopy holding 14,000 m2, and a version with 2 electric motors was tested in 2008. The balloon is now constructed in France as DynaBulle by the "Balloon Chaize".

See also 

 Canopy Bubble
 Canopy Glider

References

External links 

  Aerostatic tools Dany Cleyet-marrel
  The tree top raft''
   Santo 2006 Expedition

Film and video technology